Sar Chah-e Shur (also Romanized as Sar Chāh-e Shūr, Sar Chah Shoor, Sar Chāh Shūr, and Sar-e Chāh Shūr) is a village in Qaleh Zari Rural District, Jolgeh-e Mazhan District, Khusf County, South Khorasan Province, Iran. At the 2006 census, its population was 105, in 27 families.

References 

Populated places in Khusf County